Menno Veldhuis (born 20 November 1974) is a Dutch artist.

Biography
Born in Groenlo and grown up in Eibergen (Netherlands). From 1994 until 1999 he studied painting with Marie van Leeuwen, Paul van Dijk and Eli Content at the High-school of Arts Constantijn Huygens in Kampen (now ArtEZ Institute of the Arts in Zwolle). From 2000 until 2001 he studied history of art at the Utrecht University. From 1999 to 2003 he lives and works alternately in Arnhem, Velp und Bussum.

After an abstract series of 15 large oil paintings, titled "Machines" (2011– 2013), the artist finds in his next work "Ernte 1" ("Harvest 1", 2013) a more formal content and produces a series of Van Gogh-paintings.

In 2013 Menno Veldhuis turns also to photography and creates a series of around 150 selfies „Back to Nature“, in which he shows his tendency to self-mockery.

In 2014 the artist create a series of collages „Woods“, using remains of paper, which he originally used as paint palette for his canvases.

Exhibitions (selection)
 1999 In gebruik, Het Langhuis, Zwolle
 2007 art fair Art Brandenburg, Potsdam
 2009 Kiron Espace, Paris
 2013 Made in Potsdam, Kunstraum Potsdam
 2014 Menno Veldhuis, painting, drawing, photography, a|e GALERIE, Potsdam
 2019 The post mortem felted club (with Simone Westphal), alte Dorfkirche Golm

References
 Biography of Menno Veldhuis at Agentur Kunsttick

External links
 Menno Veldhuis' official website
 The post mortem felted club

1974 births
Living people
21st-century Dutch painters
Dutch male painters
Modern painters
Dutch photographers
People from Oost Gelre
People from Potsdam